3-Fluoro-N-ethylbuphedrone  (3F-NEB) is a substituted cathinone derivative with stimulant effects which has been sold as a designer drug. It was first identified in Sweden in 2021.

See also 
 3-Fluoromethcathinone
 3F-NEH
 3F-PVP
 3F-PiHP

References 

Cathinones
Designer drugs
Chloroarenes
Norepinephrine-dopamine releasing agents